Charles Rothwell Nesson (born February 11, 1939) is the William F. Weld Professor of Law at Harvard Law School and the founder of the Berkman Center for Internet & Society and of the Global Poker Strategic Thinking Society. He is author of Evidence, with Murray and Green, and has participated in several cases before the U.S. Supreme Court, including the landmark case Daubert v. Merrell Dow Pharmaceuticals.

In 1971, Nesson defended Daniel Ellsberg in the Pentagon Papers case. He was co-counsel for the plaintiffs in the case against W. R. Grace and Company that was made into the book A Civil Action, which was, in turn, made into the film of the same name. Nesson's nickname in the book, Billion-Dollar Charlie, was given to him by Mark Phillips, who worked with him on the W.R. Grace case.

Nesson is currently "interested in advancing justice in Jamaica, the evolution of the Internet, as well as national drug policy."

Early life and education
Nesson attended Harvard College as an undergraduate, studying mathematics.  He took the law school boards junior year, earning a nearly perfect score, but he was initially rejected early admission from Harvard Law School for his grades. After improving his grades, Nesson was accepted. Nesson surprised himself by achieving and retaining a ranking of first out of five hundred students. He is rumored to have achieved the highest grade point average since Felix Frankfurter graduated in 1907. In 1962 he received the Sears Prize ($750) for the highest grade average in the first and second years of law school.

Nesson was a law clerk to Justice John Marshall Harlan II on the United States Supreme Court, 1965 term. He then worked as a special assistant in the Department of Justice Civil Rights Division under John Doar. His first case, White v. Crook'''', made race-based and gender-based jury selection in Alabama unconstitutional. Nesson joined the Harvard Law School faculty in 1966, and was tenured three years later. In 1998, he co-founded Harvard's Berkman Center for Internet & Society.

Current activities
He is currently leading a project to "reify university as a meta player in cyberspace", to advance restorative justice in Jamaica, and to legitimize and teach poker and the value of strategic poker thinking. For the last one, he made an appearance on The Colbert Report. When Colbert joked that Nesson may have a gambling problem, he responded, "My gambling problem is that poker gets lumped in with gambling."

In May 2008, he represented the founder of National Organization for the Reform of Marijuana Laws (NORML) and the publisher of High Times Magazine, who wished to challenge Massachusetts marijuana possession laws after they were arrested for smoking marijuana at the 2007 Boston Freedom Rally.  The defendants were found guilty and sentenced to a day in jail. Nesson planned, in the wake of the conviction, to appeal the verdict.

In 2006, he taught CyberOne: Law in the Court of Public Opinion with Rebecca Nesson and Gene Koo. He teaches courses in the law and practice of evidence, Trials in Second Life, where he is represented by his avatar "Eon", and a reading group with Fern Nesson  on Freedom. He also teaches a class on the American Jury.

Nesson continued to defend Joel Tenenbaum, who is accused of downloading and sharing 31 songs on Kazaa file-sharing network, after the jury came to a $675,000 verdict against Tenenbaum. Many of Nesson's less conventional actions, including an "almost obsessive desire for transparency and documentation", drew criticism. Nesson had encouraged his client to admit that he had downloaded and shared the 31 songs after he had denied it in depositions.

In Jamaica, Nesson is pro bono counsel to the Westmoreland Hemp & Ganja Farmers Association (WHGFA).

Publications
Selected publications:
 Green, Nesson & Murray, Evidence (3rd ed. Aspen)
 Constitutional Hearsay: Requiring Foundational Testing and Corroboration under the Confrontation Clause, 81 Va. L. Rev. 149 (1995), with Yochai Benkler
 Incentives to Spoliate Evidence in Civil Litigation: The Need for Vigorous Judicial Action, 13 Cardozo L. Rev. 793 (1991)
 Agent Orange Meets the Blue Bus: Factfinding at the Frontier of Knowledge, 66 B.U.L. Rev. 521 (1986)
 The Evidence or the Event? On Judicial Proof and the Acceptability of Verdicts, 98 Harvard Law Review 1357 (1985)
 Reasonable Doubt and Permissive Inferences: The Value of Complexity'', 92 Harvard Law Review 1187 (1979)

Personal life
Following his tenure at Harvard, Nesson married Fern Leicher Nesson, one of his students, and bought a home in Cambridge, Massachusetts, near the Harvard campus where he has since lived. The Nessons have two daughters, Rebecca and Leila, and four grandchildren, Nico and Charlie, Sasha and Max and a dog affectionately called "Sweet Pea".

See also 
 List of law clerks of the Supreme Court of the United States (Seat 9)

References

External links

 Charles Nesson's blog
 Charles Nesson's webpage at Harvard Law
 Profile at Harvard Law
 
 

Law clerks of the Supreme Court of the United States
American legal scholars
Lawyers from Cambridge, Massachusetts
1939 births
Living people
Harvard Law School alumni
Harvard Law School faculty
Harvard College alumni